The 2016 Segunda División play-offs will take place in June 2016 and will determine the third team which will be promoted to the top division. Teams placed between 3rd and 6th position (excluding reserve teams) will take part in the promotion play-offs.

The regulations are the same as the previous season: in the semifinals the fifth placed team faces the fourth, while the sixth placed team faces the third. Each tie is played over two legs, with each team playing one leg at home. The team that scores more goals on aggregate over the two legs advances to the next round. If the aggregate score is level, the away goals rule is applied, i.e., the team that scores more goals away from home over the two legs advances. If away goals are also equal, then thirty minutes of extra time is played. The away goals rule is again applied after extra time, i.e., if there are goals scored during extra time and the aggregate score is still level, the visiting team advances by virtue of more away goals scored. If no goals are scored during extra time, the winner will be the best positioned team in the regular season.

Road to the playoffs

Promotion play-offs
The first leg of the semi-finals will be played on 8 and 9 June and the second leg on 11 and 12 June at home of the best positioned team. The final will also be two-legged, with the first leg on 15 June and the second leg on 18 June, with the best positioned team also playing the second leg at home.

Semifinals

|}

First leg

Second leg

Final

|}
First leg

Second leg

References

External links
Segunda División at LFP website

2015-16
play-offs
1